Sebastien Dallet (born 30 September 1973 in Bourges) is a French professional football (soccer) player, currently with Troyes AC.

Dallet is a striker and lists US Orléans, RC Lens, Guingamp, Sochaux and Créteil as his former clubs.

External links

1973 births
Living people
French footballers
Association football midfielders
RC Lens players
En Avant Guingamp players
FC Sochaux-Montbéliard players
US Créteil-Lusitanos players
ES Troyes AC players
Ligue 1 players
Ligue 2 players
Association football forwards